Tomah Joseph (1837–1914),  Joseph Tomah and Tomah Josephs, was a Passamaquoddy artist and governor of communities in Maine in the United States. He taught the future US president Franklin Delano Roosevelt how to canoe.

Early life 
Tomah Joseph was born in 1837 in the Passamaquoddy Indian Township Reservation in eastern Maine. He married Hanna Lewey. The couple had a son Sabattis in 1871.

He worked as guide during the summers around Campobello Island in southwestern New Brunswick.

Political career
Joseph was elected governor of the Passamaquoddy Tribe around 1882.

Artwork
Joseph was an accomplished birchbark canoe-maker, who notably made a canoe for the young Franklin D. Roosevelt that is now in the collection of the Roosevelt Campobello International Park.  Many of Joseph's works were birchbark manuscripts. His work is included in the collections of the Metropolitan Museum of Art, the Abbe Museum, and the National Museum of the American Indian, Smithsonian Institution.

The Haffenreffer Museum of Anthropology at Brown University hosted an exhibition, History on Birchbark: The Art of Tomah Joseph, Passamaquoddy in 1993.

References

Further reading 
 Donald Soctomah, Remember Me: Tomah Joseph's Gift to Franklin Roosevelt (Tilbury House Publishers, 2015)

External links 
 Lidded Box, ca. 1890, Tomah Joseph
 Tomah Joseph Canoe Backrest

1837 births
1914 deaths
19th-century American artists
19th-century American male artists
19th-century Native Americans
20th-century American artists
20th-century American male artists
20th-century Native Americans
Artists from Maine
Native American leaders
Native American male artists
Native American people from Maine
Passamaquoddy people